Arambram is a small town near Madavoor, Kerala in India. Arambram is 20 km away from Calicut. It belongs to Madavoor panchayath, Kozhikode Taluk and District. Arambram is in the India Standard Time time zone.

General Information

 pincode 673571
      nearest airport -Calicut Airport
      nearest Railway station  -calicut
      population approximately 6,000
      It belongs to Koduvally Legislative assembly Constituency and kozhikode Parliament Constituency.
 It has 5 polling booths, three are in arambram GMUP school, and two in kottakkav vayal lp school.

Education

The literacy rate is above 96%. Due to Gulf boom, most of the people have enough money to spend for their children's education.

Chakkalakkal HSS, and GMUP School Arambram, MSS English Medium School are some of the important educational institutes in this area. It is home to Chakkalakkal High School.

Places of importance

VMK Botanical Garden
Famous VMK Botanical Garden is situated here. In this garden, more than 250 species of plants are protected.  Noted writer VM Koya is the founder of this garden. According to VMK Botanical Garden, in 1991, VM Koya started traveling around India and in gulf countries in search of seeds to start his private plantation, now known as the VMK Botanical Garden. This botanical garden has become the habitat of animals and plants of different species.

Tourism department of the Government of Kerala has approved VMK Botanical garden as a tourist destination.

Hanging Bridge connecting Arambram to Koduvally Panchayath
A hanging bridge connects Arambram to Koduvally Panchayath. This bridge crosses Punoor River. While passing through Calicut Wayanad Highway, we can watch this bridge.

Chakkalakkal high school
Chakkalakkal high school is situated near to Arambram and provides education base for Madavoor village.

References 

Kozhikode east